The Predator comic books are part of the Predator franchise and has had several titles published based on the license, most of which are part of the Dark Horse Comics line (Dark Horse also publishes the Aliens and Alien vs. Predator lines of comics) but other comics by other distributors have been made.

Dark Horse Comics

Crossovers 

Crossovers with the Alien franchise are in their own separate article.

Stories 
Stories published in other comics unrelated to the Predator franchise.

Marvel Comics

Publications
The details of the publication of the comics and trade paperbacks include:
 Predator: Concrete Jungle (by Mark Verheiden and Chris Warner, Dark Horse, 112 pages, 1990)
 Predator: Big Game (by John Arcudi, Evan Dorkin and Armando Gil, Titan Books, 112 pages, 1992, Dark Horse, 1996)
 Predator: The Bloody Sands of Time (by Dan Barry and Chris Warner, 2-issue mini-series, 1992)
 Predator: Cold War (by Mark Verheiden, Ron Randall and Steve Mitchell, Dark Horse, 112 pages, 1993, Titan Books, 104 pages, 1995)
 Predator: Race War (by Andrew Vachss and Randy Stradley, Dark Horse, 144 pages, 1995)
 Predator: Kindred (by Scott R. Tolson and Jason Lamb, Penciller: Brian O'Connell, Roger Peterson and Inker: Bruce Patterson, 4-issue mini-series, 1996, tpb, 1997)
 Predator: Dark River (by Mark Verheiden, pencils by Ron Randall and inks by Rick Magyar, 4-issue mini-series, 1996)
 Predator: Hell & Hot Water (by Mark Schultz and Gene Colan, 3-issue mini-series, 1997, tpb, 1998)
 Predator: Primal (by Kevin J. Anderson, Penciller: Scott Kolins and Inker: John Lowe, 2-issue mini-series, 1997)
 Predator: Nemesis (by Gordon Rennie and Colin MacNeil, two-issue mini-series, 1997)
 Predator: Hell Come a Walkin (by Nancy A. Collins and Dean Ormston, two-issue mini-series, 1998)
 Predator: Captive (by Gordon Rennie and Dean Ormston, one-shot, May 1998)
 Predator: Xenogenesis (by Ian Edginton, Mel Rubi (pencils) and Andrew Pepoy (inks), for Dark Horse, 1999)
 Predators (2010, Dark Horse Comics)
 Predator: Fire and Stone (2014-2015, Dark Horse Comics)
 Predator: Life and Death (2016, Dark Horse Comics)
 Predator: Hunters (2017, Dark Horse Comics)
 Predator 30th Anniversary: The Original Comics Series (2017, Dark Horse Comics)
 Predator: Hunters II (2018-2019, Dark Horse Comics)
 Predator: The Essential Comics Volume 1 (2018, Dark Horse Comics)
 Predator: Hunters III (2020, Dark Horse Comics)

Collected editions
 Predator Omnibus Volume 1 (collects Concrete Jungle, Cold War, Dark River, Rite Of Passage, The Pride at Nghasa, The Bloody Sands Of Time, and Blood Feud, 430 pages, August 2007)
 Predator Omnibus Volume 2 (collects Big Game, God's Truth (from Dark Horse Presents 46), Race War, The Hunted City (from Dark Horse Comics 16-19), Blood on Two-Witch Mesa (from Dark Horse Comics 20-21), Invaders from the Fourth Dimension, and 1718 (from A Decade of Dark Horse 1), 360 pages, February 2008)
 Predator Omnibus Volume 3 (collects Bad Blood (including Dark Horse Comics 12-14), Kindred, Hell and Hot Water, Strange Roux, No Beast so Fierce (from Dark Horse Presents 119), and Bump in the Night (from Dark Horse Presents 124), 344 pages, June 2008)
 Predator Omnibus Volume 4 (collects Primal, Nemesis, Homeworld, Xenogenesis, Hell Come a Walkin''', Captive, and Demon's Gold, 352 pages, October 2008)

See also
 List of Alien (franchise) comics
 List of Predator (franchise) novels
 List of Alien vs. Predator (franchise) comics
 List of comics based on films
 Prey, in which Raphael Adolini of Predator: 1718 is loosely adapted.

References

Sources
 Beautiful Monsters: The Unofficial and Unauthorised Guide to the Alien and Predator Films'' (by David A. McIntee, Telos, 272 pages, 2005)

External links
 Dark Horse catalogue
 Nemesis press release
 Captive press release
 Profile for the Tarzan vs. Predator trade
 

1989 comics debuts
Comics about extraterrestrial life
Comics based on films
Dark Horse Comics limited series
Predator (franchise) comics
Comics
Lists of comics by title